Damir Krznar (born 10 July 1972) is a Croatian professional football manager and former player who is the current manager of the Slovenian PrvaLiga side Maribor.

Playing career

Club
Krznar spent his career playing for Varteks, Dinamo Zagreb and Inter Zaprešić.

International
He made his international debut coming in as a second half substitute for Robert Jarni against Poland on 22 April 1998, which was his only appearance for the Croatia national team.

Managerial career

Career as assistant  
In the period between 2010 and 2021, Krznar worked as an assistant coach to Ilija Lončarević at Inter Zaprešić, to Krunoslav Jurčić, Ante Čačić, Branko Ivanković and Zoran Mamić at Dinamo Zagreb, and to Mamić at Al Nassr, Al Ain and Al Hilal. 

He served as Dinamo interim manager on two occasions; from August to September 2013, and from July to September 2015.

Dinamo Zagreb 
After Zoran Mamić was sentenced to five years in prison on 15 March 2021, he resigned on the same day and was succeeded by Krznar, who made his debut as Dinamo head coach on 18 March in a 3–0 victory over Tottenham Hotspur at Stadion Maksimir, thus qualifying for the quarter-finals of the 2020–21 UEFA Europa League for the first time in the history of the club. Furthermore, Krznar became the first ever manager to eliminate Spurs head coach José Mourinho from the Europa League (the Portuguese took part in the competition two more times before–in 2002–03 coaching Porto, and in 2016–17 coaching Manchester United–winning both editions). However, Dinamo went on to lose their quarter-final fixture against Villarreal 3–1 on aggregate.

On 9 May 2021, Dinamo secured its 22nd Croatian First League title with a 5–1 victory over Rijeka, and the 32nd national league title in total. Ten days later, Dinamo also won the Croatian Cup title, with a victory against Istra 1961 by a scoreline of 6–3.

Krznar left Dinamo on 1 December 2021 after being eliminated by Rijeka in the quarter-finals of the Croatian Cup. However, the next month, he took over the reserve team of Dinamo, playing in the Croatian Second League, where he stayed until the team was dissolved following the 2021–22 season.

Maribor 
On 16 August 2022, Krznar took charge of the reigning Slovenian PrvaLiga champions Maribor, signing a two-year contract. At the time of his arrival, Maribor was sitting in last place in the league with only three points out of five games.

Managerial statistics

Honours

Player  
Dinamo Zagreb
 Prva HNL: 1995–96, 1996–97, 1997–98, 1998–99, 1999–00, 2002–03 
 Croatian Cup: 1995–96, 1996–97, 1997–98, 2000–01, 2001–02, 2003–04 
 Croatian Super Cup: 2002, 2003

Manager 
Dinamo Zagreb
 Prva HNL: 2020–21
 Croatian Cup: 2020–21

References

External links 
 
 Damir Krznar at Croatian Football Federation

1972 births
Living people
People from Zabok
Association football midfielders
Croatian footballers
Croatia international footballers
NK Varaždin players
GNK Dinamo Zagreb players
NK Inter Zaprešić players
Croatian Football League players
Croatian football managers
GNK Dinamo Zagreb managers
NK Maribor managers
Croatian Football League managers
Croatian expatriate football managers
Expatriate football managers in Slovenia
Croatian expatriate sportspeople in Slovenia
Croatian expatriate sportspeople in the United Arab Emirates